Mark Van Hoen (born September 1966, Croydon, London, England) is an English electronic music artist. He has created music under his own name as well as Locust, and Autocreation. Pitchfork said, "Musically, Van Hoen belongs to a distinguished family tree. Originally influenced by the likes of Brian Eno and Tangerine Dream, and later presaging both Autechre's glitch and Boards of Canada's pastoral IDM, with his latest album Van Hoen would fit in just as well alongside White Rainbow or Atlas Sound on a current label like Kranky: He combines oceanic drone with pop lyricism, using technology as a catalyst."

In 1993, Van Hoen signed with the Belgian-based record label, R&S. The initial releases were as Locust and used vintage analogue synthesizers and tape recorders. As the Locust sound moved towards an increasingly more vocal oriented approach in the late 1990s, Van Hoen also began to release music under his own name.

In October 2013, Black Hearted Brother, Van Hoen's collaboration with Neil Halstead, released their debut album,  Stars Are Our Home.

Discography as Locust
 1993: Skysplit – R&S Records
 1994: In Remembrance of Times Past – Apollo Records 
 1994: Natural Composite – Apollo Records
 1994: Needle 12" – Apollo Records
 1994: Weathered Well – Apollo Records
 1995: Truth Is Born of Arguments – Apollo Records
 1997: Morning Light – Apollo Records
 2001: Wrong – Touch
 2013: You'll Be Safe Forever – Editions Mego
 2014 : After The Rain

Discography as Mark Van Hoen
 1997: The Last Flowers From The Darkness  – Touch
 1998: Playing With Time – Apollo Records
 2004: The Warmth Inside You – Locust Sound
 2010: Where Is The Truth – City Centre Offices
 2012: The Revenant Diary – Editions Mego
2017:  The Worcester Tapes 1983-1987  – The Tapeworm 
 2018: Invisible Threads'' -  - Touch

References

External links
 Official Mark Van Hoen / Locust site
 R&S Records
 Touch Records
 Peel Session

1966 births
Living people
English electronic musicians
Ambient musicians
English experimental musicians
English people of Indian descent
English techno musicians
Intelligent dance musicians
People from Smethwick
English people of Jamaican descent
English people of Dutch descent